On 4 January 2008, a scheduled domestic Transaven flight from Simón Bolívar International Airport to Los Roques Airport,  north of the departure airport and over water, radioed that both engines had failed and that they were descending through . The crew was going to attempt a ditching as close as possible to the Los Roques archipelago. Shortly thereafter, radio contact was lost and the plane disappeared from radar.

Aircraft
The aircraft operating this flight was a Let L-410UVP-E3, registration YV2081, built in Czechoslovakia in 1987.

Search
Another Transaven Let L-410 flew over the area the aircraft was thought to have crashed, but found no trace, other than a spot of liquid on the surface of the water that soon after dissipated.

Active sea and air searches were called off without finding any trace of the aircraft.
On 12 January 2008, some fishermen found the body of a man 12 kilometres off the coast of Venezuela. After having performed the autopsy, the doctors determined that it was the corpse of the co-pilot, the 37-year-old Osmel Alfredo Avila Otamendi.
At a short distance from the place of discovery of the corpse of the co-pilot his life vest was found.

In April 2008, a Venezuelan navy vessel, using a sonar, was able to identify the presumed wreckage of an aircraft, located approximately 300 metres deep. The wreckage was recovered, but it didn't belong to the disappeared aircraft. Subsequently, search were suspended.

Discovery of the wreckage
It was discovered by the US flagship Sea Scout which was working in the area for days. The ship was looking for the wreckage of another crashed aircraft which went down five years to the day of this incident.

Passengers and crew

The crew consisted of one Venezuelan pilot and a copilot.

The Italian passengers were:
 a family from Treviso: Paolo Durante, 40 years, his wife Bruna Guerrieri and their daughters Sofia and Emma, six and eight years old respectively;
 Annalisa Montanari, 42 years, and Rita Calanni Rindina, 46 years, from Bologna;
  Stefano Frangione and Fabiola Napoli, on their honeymoon from Rome.
Along with them, there were four other passengers: a Swiss citizen and three Venezuelans.

References

External links
  "Accidentes Aéreos: Cae al Mar el YV2081, LET-410 en Los Roques el 4-1-2008", VolarEnVenezuela.com, 4 January 2008. Link accessed 5 January 2008.

Airliner accidents and incidents caused by engine failure
Aviation accidents and incidents in Venezuela
Accidents and incidents involving the Let L-410 Turbolet
Aviation accidents and incidents in 2008
2008 in Venezuela
January 2008 events in South America